Al-Jarniyah Subdistrict is a subdistrict of Al-Thawrah District in Raqqa Governorate (Syria), approximately  west of Raqqa. The subdistrict population at the 2004 census was 31,786.

Al-Jarniyah Subdistrict is bounded by Lake Assad to the West and South, Ayn al-Arab District of Aleppo Governorate to the North, and Raqqa District also of Raqqa Governorate to the East.

The administrative centre Al-Jarniyah and much of the subdistrict are currently controlled by SDF, following three years of control by ISIS and other rebel groups.

Towns and villages

The towns and villages in Al-Jarniyah Subdistrict and their populations as at the 2004 census were:
 Abu Sakhra (أبو صخرة), 730
 Abu Shamat - Abul Kalat (أبو الشامات_أبو الكالات), 525
 Ajajiyeh (العجاجية), 284
 Badiat Elshoaa (بادية الشوعة), 207
 Bir Elatshaneh (بئر العطشانة), 251
 Bir Elkhozam (بئر الخزام), 391
 Bir Haj Khalif (بئر حاج خليف), 94
 Bir Shallal (بئر شلال), 921
 Bisrawi (بصراوي), 351
 Dahweh (ضحوة), 122
 Dukhan (دخان), 415
 Eastern Jaabar (جعبر شرقي), 1180
 Falah Rabu (فلاح ربو), 2638
 Hamra (الحمرة), 408
 Hazzum (حزوم), 275
 Hurriyeh (الحرية), 810
 Hweijet Halawa (حويجة حلاوة), 1651
 Jeiber (جعيبر), aka Jabar, 277
 Jurneyyeh (الجرنية), 2686
 Kanu (الكنو), 191
 Karawan (الكروان), 600
 Khatuniya Eljerniyah (خاتونية الجرنية), 1852
 Mahmudli (Arabic: المحمودلي, Kurdish: Mahmûdiyê), 2713
 Mjeibnet Elamya (مجيبنة العمياء), 859
 Msheirfet Eljerniyeh (المشيرفة الجرنية), 434
 Mweileh (المويلح), 231
 Nafileh (النفيلة), 554
 Rajm Elhamam (رجم الحمام), 93
 Ramleh (الرملة), 1395
 Safra	الصفرة	184
 Sanjar (سنجار), 92
 Shahid Ellah (شهيد الله), 592
 Shams Eldin (شمس الدين), 2213
 Tal Othman (تل عثمان), 2024
 Tawi (طاوي), 1180
 Thaheriya (الظاهرية), 424
 Thlath Khrab (ثلاث خراب), 291
 Wasta (الواسطة), 396
 Western Jaabar (جعبر غربي), 833
 Zarijiyet Shams Eldin (زريجية شمس الدين), 171
 Al-Bahtah (الباهتة), 63
 Al-Rahrahah (الرحراحة), 408
 Al-Sakhni (السخني), 112
 Al-Turkah (الطركة), 822
 Mazyuneh (المزيونة), 333
 Shabhar (شبهر), 129

Notable places

 The castle of Qal'at Ja'bar, previously overlooking the Euphrates, but now an island in Lake Assad, lies close to Western Jaabar in the south of the subdistrict.

Syrian civil war

By March 2013 Al-Jarniyah Subdistrict, with the rest of Raqqa countryside, had fallen into rebel hands.

During December 2016 the Syrian Democratic Forces drove ISIS out of most Al-Jarniyah Subdistrict.
With the help of US special forces, Bir Shallal and nearby villages in the north-east of the nahiyah were taken over in mid December, soon followed by a corridor stretching to Wasta on Lake Assad which cut off the west of the nahiyah which was subsequently taken over. The largest town of the area, Mahmudli in the south west of the nahiyah, was taken over by the SDF at the start of 2017.

References

Populated places in al-Thawrah District
Subdistricts of Raqqa Governorate